The 2007 Individual Speedway European Championship was a speedway competition consisting of three qualifying rounds, three semi-final rounds, and a final round. The final, held on 29 September in Wiener Neustadt, was won by Jurica Pavlic of Croatia.

Final standing
   Jurica Pavlic (Croatia)
   Sebastian Ułamek (Poland)
   Patrick Hougaard (Denmark)

Calendar

Domestic qualifications

Qualifying rounds

Semi-finals

Final 
September 29, 2007
 Wiener Neustadt
Manuel Hauzinger was nominated as Austrian rider.
Changes (in order):
(5) Sławomir Drabik (Poland) → Mariusz Staszewski (Poland)
(1) Henning Bager (Denmark) → Patrick Hougaard (Denmark)

References

 Świat Żużla, No 4 (42) /2007, pages 45, 60-61, 

2007
European Individual